Ion "Bebe" Barbu (24 December 1938 – 2 May 2011) was a Romanian international football defender who played for clubs in Romania and Turkey.

Career
Born in Craiova, Barbu started playing football for Lokomotiva Craiova and Dinamo Obor București. In 1959, he joined FC Argeş Piteşti, where he would play for 13 seasons, appearing in 224 league matches and winning the Romanian league in the 1971–72 season.

In 1970, Barbu moved to Turkey to join Beşiktaş J.K. He made 20 appearances in the Süper Lig during the 1970–71 season.

He was the first FC Argeş player to be allowed to play outside of Romania during the communist regime.

Barbu made seven appearances for the Romania national football team.

Death
He died in a Piteşti hospital on 2 May 2011.

Honours
FC Argeş Piteşti
Liga I: 1971–72

References

External links
 
 
 

1938 births
2011 deaths
Romanian footballers
Romania international footballers
FC Argeș Pitești players
Beşiktaş J.K. footballers
Romanian expatriate footballers
Expatriate footballers in Turkey
Association football defenders
Sportspeople from Craiova